("White dew") was one of 32  destroyers built for the Imperial Japanese Navy (IJN) in the first decade of the 20th century.

Design and description
The Kamikaze-class destroyers were improved versions of the preceding . The Kamikazes were powered by two vertical triple-expansion steam engines, each driving one shaft using steam produced by four Kampon water-tube boilers. Their crew consisted of 70 officers and ratings.

The main armament of the Kamikaze-class ships consisted of two 40-calibre quick-firing (QF)  12 cwt guns on single mounts; the forward gun was located on superstructure, but the aft gun was at the stern. Four 28-calibre QF three-inch 8 cwt guns on single mounts were positioned abreast the superstructure, two in each broadside. The ships were also armed with two single rotating mounts for  torpedoes between the superstructure and the stern gun.

Construction and career 
Shiratsuyu was laid down at Mitsubishi's shipyard in Nagasaki on 25 February 1905 and launched on 12 February 1906. Completed on 6 June, the ship saw service in World War I and participated in the Siberian Expedition. She was decommissioned on 1 April 1928, but was reclassified as a tugboat and dispatch boat on 1 August. The ship remained in use until 12 February 1930 and was subsequently broken up.

Notes

Citations

Books

 

Kamikaze-class destroyers (1905)
1906 ships
World War I destroyers of Japan
Ships built by Mitsubishi Heavy Industries